Santo Emilião is a Portuguese Freguesia in the municipality of Póvoa de Lanhoso, it has an area of 1.74 km2 and 890 inhabitants (2011). It has a population density of 510 people per km.²

Population

References 

Freguesias of Póvoa de Lanhoso